"Born to Fly" is a song co-written and recorded by American country music artist Sara Evans. It was released in June 2000 as the first single and title track from her 2000 album of the same name. It became Evans' second number one hit on the U.S. Billboard Hot Country Singles & Tracks (now Hot Country Songs) chart in January 2001.  Evans wrote this song with Marcus Hummon and Darrell Scott.

Content
"Born to Fly" is an uptempo country song that is backed primarily with fiddles. The song's narrator is portrayed as a person wanting to expand their horizons and dreams of being somebody, who is tired of being stuck in the same place, and wants to get out. The song makes analogies to a bird spreading its wings and flying to its new destination.

The album version features a long instrumental outro for the song.

Music video
The accompanying music video for the song, Sara's first of many to be directed by Peter Zavadil, shows Evans portraying Dorothy, the main character from The Wizard of Oz motion picture.  The video also features many of the same story elements as the movie, such as a tornado, a wicked witch, and a little black dog. The video won the CMA Award for Video of the Year in 2001, Evans' first (and only as of 2020).

The video was ranked #34 on CMT's 100 Greatest Videos.

Cover versions
Country singer Lauren Alaina covered this song on the tenth season of American Idol.
Danielle Bradbery covered this song on the fourth season of The Voice.

Chart performance
"Born to Fly" debuted at number 59 on the U.S. Billboard Hot Country Singles & Tracks for the week of July 1, 2000.

Year-end charts

Notes

References 

2000 singles
2000 songs
Sara Evans songs
Songs written by Marcus Hummon
Music videos directed by Peter Zavadil
Songs written by Sara Evans
Songs written by Darrell Scott
Song recordings produced by Paul Worley
RCA Records singles